Steven James Stuart Anderson (born 19 December 1985) is a Scottish footballer who plays for Berwick Rangers. Anderson plays in central defence.

Career

Youth career
Anderson's senior career began when he stepped up from Dalkeith Boys Club to sign for Dundee United in January 2001. In the summer of 2004, he was released by Dundee United and joined Rangers on trial, but the club decided against signing him.

St Johnstone
Anderson then went on trial with St Johnstone and played in a reserve game against Forfar Athletic and in a First Division match against St Mirren on 21 August 2004. This convinced St Johnstone manager John Conolly to sign Anderson on a contract until the end of the season. Three days after signing for the club, he played in a 1–0 win over Raith Rovers. When the two sides next met, on 30 October 2004, Anderson was sent-off after fouling Hamed Sacko with 10 minutes left. Upon his return, Anderson scored his first goal for the club, in a 4–0 win over Partick Thistle on 4 December 2004. His second goal came in a 2–1 win over Raith Rovers on 12 March 2005. At the end of the season Anderson signed a new deal with the club for another season.

In the 2005–06 season, Anderson would make 27 appearances in all competitions. He signed a new contract with the club at the conclusion of the season. In the 2006–07 season, Anderson made thirty seven appearances in all competitions, as he continued to be a first team regular. At the end of the season, he signed another new one-year contract with the club.

In the 2007–08 season, Anderson signed an extended contract on a two-year deal. he would make 28 appearances during the season. The 2008–09 season was a bad season for Anderson as he suffered injuries, which resulted in him being sidelined, and on his return, his first team opportunities were limited as he was behind Kevin Rutkiewicz, Stuart McCaffrey, Gary Irvine and Graham Gartland for a first team place. His injuries started when he suffered an ankle injury in a pre-season friendly. He then suffered an ankle injury in January 2009. Nevertheless, Anderson scored his first goal of the season on the final day, in a 4–0 win over Airdrieonians, as St Johnstone were promoted to the top-flight.

In the 2009–10 season, Anderson continued to struggle to earn his place back in the first team, as he made seventeen appearances. He scored his first goal of the season from a header, as St Johnstone won 2–0 against Hamilton Academical on 3 October 2009. In the quarter final of the Scottish League Cup, Anderson scored again, as St Johnstone won 2–1 against Dundee United. In April 2010, Anderson signed a two-year contract extension that will keep him at the club until 2012.

The 2010–11 season saw Anderson regain his first team place, forming a central defensive partnership with Michael Duberry and he made thirty two appearances in all competitions. In the opening game of the season, Anderson received a straight red card after "scything" down Suso Santana in the 73rd minute, as St Johnstone drew 1–1 with Hearts. A week after his sending off, Anderson was accused by Rangers player Vladimir Weiss of being overly physical. Anderson defended his actions saying that he was simply defending. In September 2010, the referee, Brian Winter, made headlines after failing to send off Anderson despite showing two yellow cards to the player in the space of 12 minutes against Dundee United. Anderson was later banned for one match by the Scottish Football Association's disciplinary committee. At the end of the season, Anderson was named as St Johnstone's Player of the Year.

In the 2011–12 season, Anderson continued to be a first team regular despite the departure of his defensive partner Duberry. He then signed a two-year contract extension, taking him to the end of the 2013–14 season. A few weeks after signing the new contract, Anderson scored his first goal of the season, in a 5–1 loss against Dundee United. Despite scoring in the match, Anderson wasn't impressed with the result and described this as "embarrassing". In the 2012–13 season, Anderson received a straight red card for a foul before half time, as St Johnstone drew 1–1 with St Mirren. Anderson would later help St Johnstone qualify for Europe after beating Motherwell 2–0 in the last game of the season.

Anderson is nicknamed as "Victor Meldrew of Scottish football."

The 2013–14 started with four matches in the Europa League match, beginning when St Johnstone won 1–0 against Norwegian side Rosenberg in the second qualifying round first leg. St Johnstone were eliminated by Minsk in the next round, losing on penalties following a 1–1 draw on aggregate. In the league, he continued to be a first team regular in defense until he came off against Partick Thistle on 28 September 2013, after "he slipped and suffered a painful hand injury as Kris Doolan raced in for Thistle's sixth-minute opener". After going to hospital, it was announced that Anderson would be out for up to eight weeks following a lengthy operation for a dislocated thumb. Anderson said "the injury was absolute agony, the worst pain I've had". He recovered from the injury in early December and played his first game in a 3–0 win over Dundee United on 29 December 2013.

On 18 January 2014, Anderson was sent-off in a 3–3 draw against Hearts, being given a straight red card for a foul on Dale Carrick which prevented a goal scoring opportunity. St Johnstone appealed the decision and it was successful, allowing Anderson to be free to play. On 8 March 2014, Anderson scored his first goal of the season, in the Scottish Cup quarter final, in a 3–1 win over Raith Rovers. In April 2014, he scored two goals in two games against Kilmarnock and Dundee United.

On 17 May 2014, Anderson scored the first goal as St Johnstone beat Dundee United 2–0 in the Scottish Cup Final at Celtic Park. Anderson, himself, dedicated the Scottish Cup win to the owners of the club saying "They've run the club really well over the years and it was time they got their day. So it's great for them to get a bit of success. Every year we always think about getting a cup run." Following the end of the season, Anderson signed a new contract with the club on a two-year deal.

In April 2014, it was announced that Anderson was to be awarded a testimonial match for his 10 years of service to St.Johnstone. Upon learning of the testimonial, former manager, Owen Coyle, described Anderson as a "classic unsung hero", while John Conolly had said of Anderson, "He fought his corner as a kid and it is the same now. He is a courageous player and that is a fine quality to have." Unfortunately, in his testimonial, Anderson played for the whole match, but St Johnstone lost 4–0 against Hearts.

At the start of the 2014–15 season, Anderson missed out on St Johnstone's European matches, due to a hamstring injury. He made his return to the first team, in the opening league game of the season, in a 2–1 win over Ross County. Anderson scored his first goal of the season on 4 October 2014, in a 2–1 loss against St Mirren. His second goal then came on 17 January 2015, in a 2–0 win over Partick Thistle and he scored again on 21 March 2015, in a 2–0 win over St Mirren. Anderson was an almost ever-present missing one match through suspension. Anderson also helped the club qualify for the Europa League for the third time running.

In the 2015–16 season, Anderson made his first appearance of the season, playing as centre-back in the first qualifying round second leg of the Europa League against Alashkert on 9 July 2015. St Johnstone won the match 2–1, but were eliminated from the tournament on away goals. During the match, Anderson suffered a cheekbone injury after clashing with Siarhei Usenia and had to be substituted in the 72nd minute, resulting in him being taken to hospital. Initially it was feared he had suffered a broken cheekbone, but following hospital tests, it was revealed to just be badly swollen.

In March 2016, Anderson became the player with most appearances for St Johnstone, breaking Alan Main's previous record of 361. He was appointed team captain in September, following the retirement of Dave Mackay. In May 2020, Anderson left the club after 16 years. He had made 439 appearances for the club in all competitions.

Partick Thistle loan
During the 2018–19 season Anderson only made four appearances for St Johnstone. With his contract due to expire at the end of the season, he was loaned to Partick Thistle in January 2019. During his loan spell with the Jags, Anderson made 16 appearances, scoring 3 goals in all competitions.

Raith Rovers loan

Anderson joined Raith Rovers on a season long loan in September 2019.

Forfar Athletic

In July 2020, Anderson signed for Scottish League One club Forfar Athletic on a two-year deal.

Berwick Rangers

On 7 May 2022, Anderson signed a one-year contract with Lowland League side Berwick Rangers, with the further possibility of a one-year contract extension.

Career statistics

Honours
St Johnstone
Scottish Challenge Cup: 2007–08
Scottish Cup: 2013–14
2008/2009 Scottish First Division Championship

References

External links

St Johnstone FC profile

Dundee United F.C. players
Association football defenders
Footballers from Edinburgh
Scottish Football League players
Scottish footballers
St Johnstone F.C. players
Raith Rovers F.C. players
1985 births
Living people
Scottish Premier League players
Scottish Professional Football League players
Partick Thistle F.C. players
Forfar Athletic F.C. players
Berwick Rangers F.C. players